Michael Haydn's Symphony No. 22 in F major, Perger 14, Sherman 23, Sherman-adjusted 22, MH 284, was written in Salzburg in 1779.

Scored for 2 oboes, 2 bassoons, 2 horns and strings, in three movements:

Adagio - Presto
Andante, in B-flat major
Vivace assai

This symphony is the second of four by Michael Haydn to include a slow introduction before the first movement (the others are Symphonies Nos. 21, 27, and 30). All four were written between 1778 and 1785 and attached to symphonies cast in three movements (without minuets).

References
 A. Delarte, "A Quick Overview Of The Instrumental Music Of Michael Haydn" Bob's Poetry Magazine November 2006: 35 PDF
 Charles H. Sherman and T. Donley Thomas, Johann Michael Haydn (1737 - 1806), a chronological thematic catalogue of his works. Stuyvesant, New York: Pendragon Press (1993)
 C. Sherman, "Johann Michael Haydn" in The Symphony: Salzburg, Part 2 London: Garland Publishing (1982): lxviii

Symphony 22
Compositions in F major
1779 compositions